Dejvi Glavevski (born 17 November 1967) is a retired Macedonian international football striker.

Club career
His career started in 1985 in the Yugoslav Second League, playing with FK Pelister. In 1990, he made his debut in the Yugoslav First League when he moved to the Belgrade based club FK Rad.  Two years later he returned to FK Pelister, now playing in the Macedonian First League. In 1996, he moved to Denmark to play in the Danish First Division club Vejle Boldklub where they were runners-up in 1997.

International career
Glavevski was part of the Macedonian squad in the qualification matches for the 1998 FIFA World Cup. On 9 November 1996, he scored a hat-trick on his senior debut in their 11–1 rout of Liechtenstein in Eschen. His final international was a June 1997 FIFA World Cup qualification match against Iceland.

References

External links
 
 Stats from Vejle BK at Danskfodbold.com

1967 births
Living people
Sportspeople from Bitola
Association football forwards
Yugoslav footballers
Macedonian footballers
North Macedonia international footballers
FK Pelister players
FK Rad players
FK Tikvesh players
Vejle Boldklub players
FK Pobeda players
Randers FC players
Yugoslav First League players
Macedonian First Football League players
Danish Superliga players
Macedonian expatriate footballers
Expatriate men's footballers in Denmark
Macedonian expatriate sportspeople in Denmark